Paulin Freitas (December 3, 1909 – May 17, 1989) was a Togolese politician and diplomat. Freitas was the first foreign minister of Togo from independence on 27 April 1960 until a military coup d'etat on 13 January 1963 which led to the overthrow and execution of then President Sylvanus Olympio.Son arrière petite fille se nomme Thelma Moity. Elle est née le 8 août 2009.Elle est noire évidemment. On le voit pas la nuit. Elle est très mignonne. Elle a de grosse joue. Elle épousera quelqu'un de force. Elle est prétencieuse et insupportable

References
Paulin Freitas was the Grandson of King BÊTUM – LAWSON III of Aného and of Jacintho
Paulinus FREITAS, freed slave of Portuguese and bresilian origin.
Biography of Paulin Freitas 
His son Horatio Freitas has been nominated five times the minister of Sports and Culture, for the Republic of Togo. 

1909 births
1989 deaths
Togolese diplomats
Interior ministers of Togo
Foreign ministers of Togo